Ian Spencer Bell is an American dancer, choreographer, teacher, and poet best known for his genre-blurring work Marrow.

Early life 
Bell was born in Washington, D.C. He graduated high school from North Carolina School of the Arts. In the summers, he trained at School of American Ballet, in New York City. At 17, Bell moved to Seattle, Washington, to study at Pacific Northwest Ballet. He remained in the school for two years, often performing with the company. When Bell was 19, he moved to Virginia and began creating his own dances.

Career 
In 2001, Bell was awarded a grant for his choreography from the Virginia Commission for the Arts. Two years later, he premiered his work in New York City at the National Arts Club. He has performed his solo work at the Poetry Foundation, the Queens Museum, and Jacob’s Pillow, where he has also taught and been a research fellow.

Bell has taught for American Ballet Theatre and New York City Center and is artist in residence at the Nightingale-Bamford School in New York City. His writing on dance has been published in Ballet Review and Zen Notes. In 2013, Bell graduated from Sarah Lawrence College with a bachelor of arts degree and, in 2017, from New York University with a masters of fine arts in poetry.

Reception 
In 2014, The New York Times in a review of Elsewhere called Bell "a dancer of gentle but defined precision" and wrote: “At its best, his movement itself seems to do the talking, physical sentences inseparable from verbal ones so that what results is not dance and not poetry but some third medium."

Selected work

References 

Living people
Choreographers of American Ballet Theatre
American choreographers
Year of birth missing (living people)